A by-election for the Australian House of Representatives seat of Griffith occurred on Saturday 8 February 2014. Terri Butler retained the seat for Labor with a 51.8 (−1.2) percent two-party vote against Liberal National Party candidate Bill Glasson.

Background
Former Prime Minister Kevin Rudd announced on 13 November 2013 that he would step down from the parliament after his party's defeat at the 2013 election.

The division of Griffith is located in the inner suburbs of Queensland's capital city, Brisbane. Since the seat's creation in 1934, Griffith has changed parties eight times. Labor's Kevin Rudd had held the seat since regaining it for Labor in 1998, having previously unsuccessfully contested the seat in 1996. Rudd retained Griffith at the 2013 election with 53 percent of the two-party-preferred vote from primary votes of Liberal 42.2 percent, Labor 40.4 percent, Greens 10.2 percent, Palmer 3.4 percent, with the remaining seven candidates on a collective 3.8 percent. Rudd's support was highest in Griffith at the 2007 election with 62.3 percent of the two-party vote when he led Labor to government. At the 2010 election he retained his seat with 58.5 percent of the two-party vote.

The tender of the resignation to the Speaker took place on 22 November 2013. The writ for the election was issued on 6 January 2014. Electoral rolls closed 8pm 13 January 2014, candidate nominations closed midday 16 January 2014, with declaration of candidate nominations and ballot order draw occurring midday 17 January 2014. The by-election occurred between 8am and 6pm on 8 February 2014.

It was the first by-election for the House of Representatives since the Bradfield and Higgins by-elections in December 2009, the second longest interval between by-elections.

Candidates
The 11 candidate nominations in ballot paper order were:

The Palmer United Party, Rise Up Australia Party and Socialist Alliance did not re-contest Griffith at the by-election.

Betting/polling
Upon the 6 January announcement of the by-election date, odds from Sportingbet favoured Labor at $1.18 against $4.25 for the LNP.

Queensland federal statewide Newspoll conducted from October to December 2013 indicated a three percent two-party swing from the LNP to Labor since the 2013 election, while Nielsen conducted in November 2013 indicated a 12 percent two-party swing from the LNP to Labor.

The last and only time a federal government won a by-election from an opposition was at the 1920 Kalgoorlie by-election. Political analysts predicted that Labor would retain Griffith.

Two-party-preferred history

Results

Results are final. The ABC's Antony Green said at 8pm on election night that Terri Butler had retained the seat for Labor.

See also
 List of Australian federal by-elections
 2014 Redcliffe state by-election

External links
2014 Griffith by-election: Antony Green ABC
2014 Griffith by-election: AEC

References

2014 elections in Australia
Queensland federal by-elections
2010s in Queensland